Major General Léo Richer LaFlèche,  (April 16, 1888 – March 7, 1956) was a Canadian general, civil servant, diplomat, and politician.

Léo Richer La Flèche was born in Concordia, Kansas, on April 16, 1888. The same year, with his parents, Léo moved to Sorel, Quebec, because of his father's work in Ottawa as a civil servant. Leo managed the Molson Bank in Ville St-Pierre until the outbreak of the First World War.  He served with the Royal 22nd Battalion, CEF, during World War I, as an infantry officer, where he was severely wounded. On June 17, 1916, a soldier in Léo's battalion noticed him lying in a field, left for dead. He and four other soldiers transported the dying officer on a stretcher as they crossed a battlefield under German artillery fire. The General in charge spotted the heroic act and as a result, the five soldiers were each awarded a Military Medal. In 1917, Léo was awarded the Distinguished Service Order and the Légion d'honneur of France for his service. He later became a lieutenant-colonel commanding the District Depot No. 4, Montreal which consisted of roughly 70,000 men. He would achieve the rank of major general. He co-founded the Canadian Legion in 1925 and became dominion president of the Canadian Legion in 1929. From 1932 to 1939, he was Deputy Minister of National Defence, Vice-Chairman Defence Council and briefly served as military attaché to Paris before the German invasion.

From 1940 to 1942, he was the associate deputy minister of War Services and was chairman of the National Film Board from 1941 to 1943. In 1941, he received an honorary LL.D. from the University of Ottawa.

He was elected as the Liberal candidate to the House of Commons of Canada for the Quebec electoral district of Outremont in a by-election on November 30, 1942, called after the MP at the time, Thomas Vien, resigned. He defeated future mayor of Montreal Jean Drapeau who was running for the Bloc Populaire. Later that year, Prime minister Mackenzie King named him Minister of National War Services. He remained in this role until he became the first Canadian ambassador to Greece on April 17, 1945, a post he kept until 1949.

On October 20, 1949, he presented his credentials to the governor general of Australia as the new high commissioner of Canada. On August 19, 1952, he also held this position in Buenos Aires, Argentina, as he officially took his post as the Canadian ambassador extraordinary and plenipotentiary in charge of the diplomatic relations with neighbouring Uruguay. He returned to Canada in 1955. He died the next year at the age of 67. His grave is in the Notre Dame des Neiges Cemetery of Montreal.

References

External links

Generals of World War II

1888 births
1956 deaths
Military attachés
20th-century Canadian civil servants
Ambassadors of Canada to Argentina
Ambassadors of Canada to Greece
Ambassadors of Canada to Uruguay
Canadian generals
Canadian Expeditionary Force officers
Canadian Companions of the Distinguished Service Order
Recipients of the Legion of Honour
Liberal Party of Canada MPs
Members of the House of Commons of Canada from Quebec
Members of the King's Privy Council for Canada
High Commissioners of Canada to Australia
People from Concordia, Kansas
Burials at Notre Dame des Neiges Cemetery
Canadian military personnel of World War I
Canadian Army generals of World War II
Royal 22nd Regiment officers
Military personnel from Kansas